The palmar carpal branch of the radial artery is a small branch of the radial artery which arises near the lower border of the pronator quadratus, and, running across the front of the carpus, anastomoses with the palmar carpal branch of the ulnar artery.

References 

Arteries of the upper limb